David Hearn may refer to:

David Hearn (canoeist) (born 1959), American slalom canoeist
David Hearn (golfer) (born 1979), Canadian golfer
David A. Hearn (1853–?), Canadian lawyer